Mbocayaty del Yhaguy is a town in the Cordillera department of Paraguay.

Sources 
World Gazeteer: Paraguay – World-Gazetteer.com
Populated places in the Cordillera Department